Victoria Commercial Bank (VCB) is a private bank in Kenya. It is licensed as a commercial bank, by the Central Bank of Kenya, the Central Bank and national banking regulator.

Location
The bank maintains Five branches in Nairobi, Kenya's capital.

History
Victoria Commercial Bank was established in 1987 as Victoria Finance Company, a non-bank finance institution (NBFI). In 1996, following the issuance of a banking licence by the Central Bank of Kenya, the company rebranded to Victoria Commercial Bank.

Overview
The bank is a Tier III private bank in Kenya, East Africa's largest economy. VCB focuses on serving large corporations and high-net-worth clients. The bank also offers personal banking services to the employees of its corporate clients. Later, it began making loans to qualifying small and medium enterprises (SMEs).

, the bank's total assets were valued at about US$225.2 million (KES:22.4 billion), with shareholders' equity of about US$50.85 million (KES:5.06 billion).

Ownership
, the shareholding in the stock of Victoria Commercial Bank was as follows:

Branches
, Victoria Commercial Bank maintains Five branches in the city of Nairobi, Kenya.

Credit rating
In July 2016, the South African credit rating agency Global Credit Ratings (GCR) rated the bank as BBB with stable outlook. The  bank has a history of "operating without a loan default for the last 10 years". During the first 6 months of 2017, VCB declared its first non-performing loan in the past  10 years. The defaulted loan is valued at KSh18.3 million. (approx. US$180,000).

See also
 List of banks in Kenya
 Economy of Kenya

References

External links
 Website of Central Bank of Kenya
 Website of Victoria Commercial Bank
 Victoria Commercial Bank Profit After Tax drops by 17 Percent

Banks of Kenya
Banks established in 1987
Companies based in Nairobi
Kenyan companies established in 1987